Chingri malai curry or malai chingri,  also known as prawn malai curry, is a Bengali curry made from tiger (bagda) and king prawns (chingri) and coconut milk and flavoured with spices. The dish is popular throughout Bengal and is served during weddings and celebrations, or for guests, and was also very popular among the British in Bengal. 
It is a really popular dish from Cox's Bazar.

Ingredients 

The main ingredients are prawns and coconut milk, along with ghee or mustard oil, onions, turmeric powder, chopped green chilli, garlic paste, and ginger paste flavoured with spices. To give the curry a bright red or maroon colour, 2 teaspoon of sugar can be added in mustard oil in which the curry has to be prepared.

Lobster malai curry is a variation of this dish.

Preparation 

The hard shells of the prawns are removed and marinated with sesame seeds and posto seeds (which are made into a paste). The prawns are then fried in hot oil along with onion, ginger, garlic, and stirred with turmeric and sugar and salt and coconut milk for a few minutes.

See also 
 Daab Chingri

References 

Bengali cuisine
Bengali curries
Bangladeshi cuisine
Indian cuisine
Shrimp dishes
Indian seafood dishes